Sagittaria teres, the quill-leaved arrowhead or slender arrowhead, is an aquatic plant species in the genus Sagittaria native to the northeastern United States: Rhode Island (Providence and Washington Counties), Massachusetts, New Hampshire (Hillsborough County), New York (Suffolk County) and New Jersey.

Sagittaria teres  grows along the shores of lakes, marshes, and other wetlands, frequently those with acidic water such as Sphagnum bogs.

Sagittaria teres is a perennial herb up to 80 cm (32 inches) tall. Leaves can grow both under the water and above it. Flowers are white, up to 1.5 cm (0.6 inches) in diameter, borne in one or more whorls on a stalk rising above the leaves.

Conservation status in the United States
It is listed as endangered in Connecticut, New Jersey, New York (state), and Rhode Island. It is listed as a special concern Massachusetts.

References

External links
Adrienne L. Edwards & Rebecca R. Sharitz. 2000. Population genetics of two rare perennials in isolated wetlands: Sagittaria isoetiformis and S. teres (Alismataceae). American Journal of Botany August 2000 vol. 87 no. 8 1147-1158 includes genetic and ecological information on both species, plus distribution map

teres
Flora of the Northeastern United States
Plants described in 1890
Freshwater plants
Flora without expected TNC conservation status